Cobble Hill is a small community on Vancouver Island, British Columbia, Canada. According to the 2016 census, there are 5,019 people living in Cobble Hill.

The town features many hiking trails and paths cover the hills and forests of this area, which is well known for its mountain biking opportunities. More recently the area has become famous for its vineyards, which have won awards for their wines. The settlement was served by the Via Rail Victoria – Courtenay train until suspended indefinitely in 2011. The Island Rail Corridor passes through the area.

The village centre contains basic shops and services including a post office, pub, coffee shop and a small grocery store. The village centre also has a couple of parks, a dog park, community centre and an independent school (K-7).

Parts of the 1994 version of Little Women from the novel by Louisa May Alcott were filmed here.

Notable residents
 Frances Oldham Kelsey - FDA pharmacologist. Kelsey was most famous as the reviewer for the U.S. Food and Drug Administration (FDA) who refused to authorize thalidomide for market because she had concerns about the drug's safety. Her concerns proved to be justified when it was shown that thalidomide caused serious birth defects.

Robbie Price, American sprint car driver most famous for the 2019 dirt cup title.

See also
Kinsol Trestle
Arbutus Ridge Seaside Community for Active Adults

References

External links
Vancouver Island - Cobble Hill

Unincorporated settlements in British Columbia
Populated places in the Cowichan Valley Regional District
Designated places in British Columbia
Cowichan Valley